Jack Mann may refer to:

 Jack Mann (ice hockey) (1919–1980), ice hockey player
 Jack Mann (winemaker) (1906–1989), winemaker in Western Australia 
 Jack Mann (rugby union) (born 1999), Scottish rugby player
 Jack Mann, pen name of E. C. Vivian (1882–1947), British editor and writer